James Reiter is a Canadian politician. He was elected to represent the electoral district of Rosetown-Elrose in the Legislative Assembly of Saskatchewan in the 2007 election. He is a member of the Saskatchewan Party.

On May 29, 2009, Reiter was appointed Minister of Highways & Infrastructure by Saskatchewan Premier Brad Wall.

|-
 
|NDP
|Eric Anderson
|align="right"|1,592
|align="right"|19.99%
|align="right"|

|- bgcolor="white"
!align="left" colspan=3|Total
!align="right"|7,964
!align="right"|100.00%
!align="right"|

Cabinet positions

References

 Honourable Jim Reiter. Government of Saskatchewan. Retrieved 2010-12-22.

Saskatchewan Party MLAs
Living people
Members of the Executive Council of Saskatchewan
21st-century Canadian politicians
Year of birth missing (living people)